Teo el pelirrojo is a 1986 Spanish drama film directed by Paco Lucio. It was entered into the 36th Berlin International Film Festival.

Cast
 Nur Al Levi
 Juan Diego Botto
 María Botto
 Álvaro de Luna
 Luis Escobar Kirkpatrick
 Concha Leza
 Ovidi Montllor
 María Luisa San José

References

External links

1986 films
1986 drama films
Spanish drama films
1980s Spanish-language films
1980s Spanish films